Pyar Ka Mausam is a 1969 Indian Hindi-language musical romance film under Nasir Hussain films banner. Hussain wrote, produced, and directed the film. It starred Shashi Kapoor, and the Nasir Husain fixture- Asha Parekh. It also had Bharat Bhushan, Nirupa Roy, Madan Puri, Tahir Hussain and another Nasir Husain fixture Rajendranath. Nasir's nephew Faisal Khan who was 3 years old at the time plays Shashi Kapoor's character as a child. Two more Husain fixtures were responsible for the memorable songs:  lyricist Majrooh Sultanpuri and music composer R.D. Burman. The musical instrument duggi was played by Homi Mullan for the song  Ni sultana re. R.D.Burman also had an acting role in the film. The film became a Silver Jubilee Hit.

Analysis 
The story was on Nasir Husain's favorite theme, a family whose members get separated at the start of the movie and after much action are reunited at the end of the movie. The theme song (Tum bin jaoon kahan) is played several times in the film:  Mohammed Rafi's version is picturized on the hero Shashi Kapoor three times, while Kishore Kumar's version is picturized on Bharat Bhushan twice.  The song is a key part of the movie like the key songs in later movies of Nasir Hussain (Yaadon Ki Baraat and Hum Kisise Kum Naheen).
The key song helps in uniting long lost family/lovers in all three films.

Plot 
Seema is the only child of widowed Mohan, who is adopted by Mohan's boss, Sardar Ranjit Singh, who has no heir to his estate, as his daughter, Jamuna, eloped with a poor peasant, Gopal. Ranjit does not get along with his step-brother, Shankar. Jamuna manages to placate her dad, & he goes to her house, only to find it in flames with Gopal burned to death, and their son, Sunder, missing. Years later, Seema has now grown up and meets with a young man named Pyarelal in Ooty. She meets him a year later, but this time he introduces himself as Jhatpat Singh, a man she was supposedly engaged to in their childhood. Shortly thereafter she meets with the real Jhatpat Singh, and changes her mind about the fake Jhatpat Singh alias Pyarelal. Now Sunil knows that he was adopted and understands that he was the lost son of Gopal. He goes to Sardar Ranjit Singh and appoints to be an estate manager. There he meets Seema again and they rekindle their romance. By that time, planning to steal away property, Shankar sends his son as the lost son of Jamuna and Gopal. Ranjit Singh believes him and wants to marry Seema to Shankar's son. After some misunderstandings, family finally reunites and Jamuna's sanity returns. Movie ends with the marriage of Seema and Sunil/Sunder.

It is one of two films in which Music Director Rahul Dev Burman plays a role of Jhatpat Singh's assistant in the film apart from giving the music for the film, the other being Bhoot Bungla.

Cast 

Shashi Kapoor as Sunder/Sunil/Pyarelal
Asha Parekh as Seema Kumar
Bharat Bhushan as Gopal
Nirupa Roy as Jamuna
Kishen Mehta as Ramesh
Iftekhar as Keshav
Rajendra Nath as Fake Jhatpat Singh
Asit Sen as Kunvar Saheb
Tahir Hussain as Sardar Ranjit Kumar
M. B. Shetty as Samson
Faisal Khan as Young Sunder
Birbal as Real Jhatpat Singh
Karen Lesley as Ms. Loveleena
Dulari as Kamla Kumar
Tabassum as Tara
Laxmi Chhaya as Lajwanti 'Lajjo'
Madan Puri as  Shanker
Rahul Dev Burman as Assistant of Real Jhatpat Singh

Soundtrack

References

External links 
 

1969 films
1960s Hindi-language films
Films scored by R. D. Burman
Films directed by Nasir Hussain